British Summer Time Hyde Park (BST Hyde Park) is a series of concerts held over two or three weekends once a year in London's Hyde Park. Since 2013, BST Hyde Park has seen headliners such as Celine Dion, the Rolling Stones, Bon Jovi, Barbra Streisand, Lionel Richie, Kylie Minogue, Black Sabbath, Neil Young, Pearl Jam, Tom Petty & the Heartbreakers, Guns N' Roses, The Who, Blur, The Strokes, Taylor Swift and Adele. In 2022 the capacity was 65,000.

2023

2022

2020 
Note: Below is the scheduled line-up for the 2020 series; on 8 April 2020, the entire series was cancelled due to public assembly concerns in regards to the coronavirus pandemic.

2019

2018

As well as the music artists showed above, the FIFA World Cup semi-final match between England and Croatia was screened. This was the largest London screening of a football match since 1996.

2017

2016

2015

2014

2013

Elton John had been scheduled to perform on Friday 12 July, but he had to cancel due to illness. All tickets were refunded and the event was made free as a one-off.

References

Music festivals in London